Argyripnus is an oceanic  ray-finned fish genus in the marine hatchetfish family Sternoptychidae. They are commonly known as bristle-mouth fishes, but that may also refer to the related bristlemouth family (Gonostomatidae). A. iridescens is called "pearlside", which usually refers to the closely related genus Maurolicus.

Species
There are currently seven recognized species in this genus:
 Argyripnus atlanticus Maul, 1952
 Argyripnus brocki Struhsaker, 1973 (Brock's Bristle-mouth Fish)
 Argyripnus electronus Parin, 1992
 Argyripnus ephippiatus C. H. Gilbert & Cramer, 1897 (Gilbert & Cramer's Bristle-mouth Fish)
 Argyripnus hulleyi Quéro, Spitz & Vayne, 2009 (Reunion bristle-mouth fish)
 Argyripnus iridescens McCulloch, 1926 (Brilliant Pearlside)
 Argyripnus pharos Harold & Lancaster, 2003

Fossils of bristle-mouth fishes show that the genus was already distinct in the Late Oligocene, more than 23 million years ago.

References

  (2002): [Argyripnus]. In: A compendium of fossil marine animal genera. Bulletins of American Paleontology 364: 560. HTML database excerpt

Sternoptychidae
Extant Chattian first appearances
Marine fish genera
Ray-finned fish genera
Taxa named by Charles Henry Gilbert
Chattian genus first appearances